Leading to War is a 2008 American documentary film composed entirely of archival news footage of the declarations of the United States President George W. Bush and his administration explaining their reasons to attack Iraq in 2003. The film is presented as a historical record and highlights the rhetorical devices and techniques employed by a government to wage war against another nation.

Presented chronologically from President Bush's State of the Union Address in January 2002 (the Axis of evil speech), and continuing up to the announcement of formal U.S. military action in Iraq on March 19, 2003, the film presents selected interviews, speeches, and press conferences given by Bush and his administration, including Vice President Dick Cheney, Secretary of Defense Donald Rumsfeld, Secretary of State Colin Powell, National Security Advisor Condoleezza Rice, Deputy Secretary of Defense Paul Wolfowitz. Non-U.S. sources include British Prime Minister Tony Blair.

Subtitled in 19 languages, including English, Bahasa, Castilian, French, German, Hindi, Italian, Japanese, Korean, Mandarin, Polish, Portuguese, Russian, Spanish, Thai, Turkish, Vietnamese.

Footage was licensed from major news sources, including ABC, AP, BBC, CNN, ITN, and NBC.

In addition to the pre-war claims made by the Bush administration as presented in the film, the filmmakers also maintain a website that analyzes the wide-ranging strategies and rhetorical techniques used by the administration in marketing the idea of a war with Iraq. It also tracks the cost of the Iraq War in terms of lives lost, the mentally and physically injured, the number of refugees, and the financial burden.

External links
 
 Official site free download and streaming video with subtitles in 19 languages, 72 min
 

2008 films
American documentary films
Documentary films about the Iraq War
2008 documentary films
2000s English-language films
2000s American films